Erasmo de Carvalho Braga (23 April 1877 – 11 May 1932) was a Brazilian Protestant evangelical leader.

Life

Erasmo de Carvalho Braga was born in Rio Claro, São Paulo, Brazil on 23 April 1877.
His father was from Portugal, and was one of the first ministers of the Presbyterian Church of Brazil.
He attended Mackenzie College, a missionary school in São Paulo.
He graduated from the Presbyterian Seminary in São Paulo, was ordained in 1898 and became a pastor near Rio de Janeiro.
In 1901 he returned to Sao Paolo to teach at the Mackenzie College and the Presbyterian Seminary.

In 1916 Braga attended the Congress on Christian Work in Panama City, where he embraced evangelical concepts.
He became general secretary of the Brazilian Committee on Cooperation in 1920.
This was a branch of the Committee on Cooperation in Latin America, established after the Panama congress and led by Robert Elliott Speer and Samuel Guy Inman.

Braga became the best known Brazilian evangelical.
He believed that the evangelical churches in Latin America should inspire the people, as they had in Europe, to embrace ideals of ethics, democracy, education and social and economic progress.
The churches should attempt to transform society and implant God's kingdom on earth.
He tried to bring together Presbyterians, Methodists, Congregationalists and Episcopalians, but with mixed success.
Erasmo de Carvalho Braga died on 11 May 1932 in Niterói, Rio de Janeiro.

Selected publications

Notes

Sources

1877 births
1932 deaths
Brazilian Presbyterians
People from Rio Claro, São Paulo